The Rungarungawa were an indigenous Australian people of the state of Queensland.

Country

History of contact
Around 1880, some years after their lands were taken up for white colonization, the Rungarungawa's number were estimated to be approximately 120.

Alternative names
 Dungadungara
 Ringarungawah.
 Runga-Rungawah
 Rungo Rungo.

Some words
 birri-birri. (whiteman)
 numma. (mother)
 peealee. (wild dog)
 toota.(tame dog)
 yapperi. (father)

Source:

Notes

Citations

Sources

Aboriginal peoples of Queensland